In enzymology, a tryptophan transaminase is an enzyme that catalyzes the chemical reaction

L-tryptophan + 2-oxoglutarate  (indol-3-yl)pyruvate + L-glutamate

Thus, the two substrates of this enzyme are L-tryptophan and 2-oxoglutarate, whereas its two products are (indol-3-yl)pyruvate and L-glutamate.

This enzyme belongs to the family of transferases, specifically the transaminases, which transfer nitrogenous groups.  The systematic name of this enzyme class is L-tryptophan:2-oxoglutarate aminotransferase. Other names in common use include L-phenylalanine-2-oxoglutarate aminotransferase, tryptophan aminotransferase, 5-hydroxytryptophan-ketoglutaric transaminase, hydroxytryptophan aminotransferase, L-tryptophan aminotransferase, and L-tryptophan transaminase.  This enzyme participates in tryptophan metabolism.  It employs one cofactor, pyridoxal phosphate.

References

 
 
 

EC 2.6.1
Pyridoxal phosphate enzymes
Enzymes of unknown structure